When You Land Here, It's Time to Return is a full-length album released by indie rock band Flake Music before changing their name to The Shins. The album was recorded in 1997 and was released on Omnibus Records.

In a May 2009 interview with Pitchfork, frontman James Mercer announced plans to re-release the album on his own record label, Aural Apothecary. The new version of the album was mixed by Danger Mouse's sound engineer Kentoro Takahashi. The reissue was released on CD and vinyl on November 24, 2014 in Europe and on November 25, 2014 in North America.

Track listing

Before the 2014 reissue, the titles of tracks 5, 8, and 10 were unknown, and not listed on any official release of the album. They were typically left blank or listed as "untitled".

Personnel

Credits are adapted from the remastered album's liner notes.

Personnel
 Del Winiecki – engineering
 Nick Noeding Jr. – engineering 
 Flake Music – mixing
 Kentoro Takahashi – mixing
 JJ Golden – mastering

Artwork
 Flake Music – art direction
 Jeff Kleinsmith – art direction, design
 Kieth Negley – painting
 Kendall Taylor – photography
 Neal Langford – sleeve

References

1997 debut albums
The Shins albums